XHKD-FM is a radio station in Ciudad Acuña, Coahuila, Mexico. Broadcasting on 103.1 FM, XHKD carries a pop format known as Digital 103.1.

History
The station began as XEKD-AM 1010, with a concession awarded to Casimiro González Martínez and then located on the highway to San Carlos, Coahuila.

The station has remained in his family ever since, being transferred to Amalia Lozano Vda. de González in 1966 and to the current concessionaire in 1987. The concessionaire is owned by Roberto González, who owns stations in the US and Mexico under the name RCommunications and holds family ties to Grupo RCG.

References

Spanish-language radio stations
Radio stations in Coahuila
Mexican radio stations with expired concessions